The 2008 Belgian Super Cup is a football match that was played on 9 August 2008, between league winners Standard Liège and cup winners Anderlecht. Standard won 3–1.

Match details

See also
Belgian Supercup

Belgian Super Cup 2008
Belgian Super Cup 2008
Super Cup
Belgian Supercup
August 2008 sports events in Europe